British Army Independent Companies in South Carolina formed a major component of the Province of South Carolina's military security. Regular independent companies were first established in British North America in 1664. The first Independent Company in South Carolina was organized in 1721. With the raising of Oglethorpe's Regiment in 1737 it was disbanded. In 1746 three understrength independent companies were sent to South Carolina, but they were disbanded two years later. When Oglethorpe's Regiment was disbanded in 1748, three new independent companies were raised in South Carolina, partly recruited with soldiers from the disbanded regiment. These three companies participated in the French and Indian War and the Cherokee War, participating in the Battle of Fort Necessity, the Braddock Expedition, the battle of the Monongahela, and the siege of Fort Loudoun. They were disbanded in 1763, with the rest of the British army independent companies in North America.

Background
Independent companies are military units not belonging to a regimental organization. In England, independent garrison companies existed since the end of the 15th century. The first three English independent companies in North America arrived in Boston in 1664, and were used to conquer the Dutch colony of New Netherland. During the French and Indian Wars, independent garrison companies were stationed not only in the New York Colony, but also in Massachusetts Bay, Virginia, and South Carolina. In 1740, the four independent companies of New York were the only in the Thirteen Colonies, but after the disbandment of Oglethorpe's Regiment in 1748 three new independent companies were raised for service in South Carolina. The four companies in New York and the three companies in South Carolina were the independent companies that served during the French and Indian War.

Standing in the community
The independent companies were recruited in Britain and the soldiers rarely, if ever, returned to the old country after having left the service. The British Army was largely recruited among the poor and the criminal classes; yet, the independent companies had lower status. Their ranks were often filled with people who had left the regular service; former soldiers mainly, but also deserters. The officers were often promoted non-commissioned officers. As the independent companies were virtually ignored by the military authorities in Britain they became dependent on the local American communities, often relying on them for food, clothing, and housing. Soon they became rooted in the local society; transforming the military service into a sideline of a civilian occupation.

South Carolina 1721–1737
Facing an expected Spanish threat, the province of South Carolina in 1719 requested military aid from the motherland. The British government drafted men from all garrison companies in Britain, thereby managing to create an independent company of 100 men, which was sent to South Carolina in 1721. The company was used to garrison Fort King George, previously built and garrisoned by provincial scouts, until a fire in 1727 destroyed the fort, when the company was moved to Port Royal. In 1730 part of the company was transferred to St. Simons Island, Georgia where they built and garrisoned Fort Delegal. When the raising of Oglethorpe's Regiment was authorized in 1737, the South Carolina independent company ceased to exist, forming the nucleus of the new regiment.

South Carolina 1746–1749
During King George's War, South Carolina was not content with being protected by troops based in Georgia, and asked the government in London for troops stationed in the colony. In 1746 three understrength independent companies were sent to South Carolina, their 60 officers and other ranks forming a core for enlargement; the missing men to be recruited in Charleston and Virginia. After the end of the war, the companies were disbanded together with Oglethorpe's Regiment. Three new independent companies would be recruited, however, to serve in South Carolina. The discharged soldiers could enlist in the new companies, return to England, or remain in Georgia.

South Carolina 1749–1763
In the preludes to the French and Indian War, Lieutenant Colonel George Washington had been ordered to remove the French from Fort Duquesne. In addition to the 300 men from his own provincial Virginia Regiment, an independent company from South Carolina was sent under the command of Captain James Mackay to his aid; ultimately suffering defeat and surrender with Washington at the Battle of Fort Necessity. Captain Mackay, being an officer with the King's commission, refused to obey Washington's orders, as coming from a provincial officer. Washington left Mackay and his company at Fort Necessity when initially moving forward towards Fort Duquesne, since the captain refused to let his men work on the road Washington was making through the woods, without extra pay. At the battle, however, they fought with fervor, suffering greater losses than the Virginians.

Later, the company, now under Captain Paul Demere, participated in Braddock's Expedition, again suffering a defeat, now at the battle of the Monongahela. When inspected, it was found to be in much better military order than the two independent companies from New York also joining the expedition. At the battle they formed the rearguard together with a provincial company of Virginia rangers. During the expedition's confused retreat, the steadfastness and fighting spirit of these two companies saved the remnants of the army from being surrounded and totally annihilated.

A second South Carolina independent company, under Captain Raymond Demere participated in the construction of Fort Loudon on the Tennessee River in 1756, built on the request of the Cherokees in the Overhill Cherokee country. The fort was then garrisoned by the company, with Captain Demere as its commandant. In 1757, the command was transferred to Captain Paul Demere. The  beginning of the Cherokee War saw South Carolina Independent Companies in garrison at Charleston, Fort Prince George, and Fort Loudoun. Soon hostile Cherokees invested both forts. Fort Loudoun had to surrender in 1760; all the officers except one being killed after the surrender, the men becoming Cherokee hostages. After the war, the prisoners were ransomed and released. Fort Prince George held out until finally relieved in 1761.

Disbandment
In 1763, all the independent companies in British North America were disbanded as a matter of policy; being replaced by regular British army regiments permanently stationed in America.

Campaigns
 Fort Duquesne Campaign, 1754.
 Braddock's Campaign, 1755.
 Cherokee War, 1759–1761.

References

Citations

Cited literature
 Anderson, Fred (2000). Crucible of War. Knopf.
 Anonymous (1756). A List of the Colonels, Lieutenant Colonels, Majors, Captains, Lieutenants, and Ensigns of His Majesty's Forces on the British Establishment. London: War Office. [cited as "Army List 1756".]
 Arthur, John Preston (1996). Western North Carolina: A History. The Overmountain Press.
 Brumwell, Stephen (2002). Redcoats. Cambridge University Press.
 Cashin, Edwar J. (2009). Guardians of the Valley. The University of South Carolina Press.
 Corkran, David H. (2016). The Cherokee Frontier. University of Oklahoma Press.
 Foote, William Alfred (1966). The American Independent Companies of the British Army 1664-1764. Thesis - University of California, Los Angeles.
 Fortesceu, J.W. (1899). A History of the British Army. Vol. 2. London: Macmillan and Co.
 Ivers, Larry E. (2015). "Fort King George (Georgia)." Colonial Wars of North America, 1512-1763. Routledge.
 Guy, Alan J. (1994). "The Army of the Georges 1714-1783." David G. Chandler & Ian Becket (ed.), The Oxford History of the British Army (Oxford University Press).
 Jones, Charles (1878). The Dead Towns of Georgia. Applewood Books.
 McCabe, James Dabney (1876). The Centennial Book of American Biography. P.W. Ziegler & Co.
 O'Meara, Walter (1979). Guns at the Forks. University of Pittsburgh Press.
 Preston, David L. (2015). Braddock's Defeat. Oxford University Press.
 Washington, George (2004). George Washington Remembers. Rowman & Littlefield Publishers.
 Wood, Virginia Steel & Bullard, Mary A., eds. (1996). Journal of a Visit to the Georgia Islands. Mercer University Press.
 Yonge, Will (1740). A List of the Colonels, Lieutenant Colonels, Majors, Captains, Lieutenants, and Ensigns of His Majesty's Forces on the British Establishment. London: War Office. [cited as "Army List 1740".]

Military units and formations established in 1721
Military units and formations established in 1746
Military units and formations established in 1749
Military units and formations disestablished in 1737
Military units and formations disestablished in 1749
Military units and formations disestablished in 1763
Infantry units and formations of the British Army
French and Indian War
Colonial South Carolina